Ripening Youth is a 1955 West German drama film directed by Ulrich Erfurth and starring Adelheid Seeck, Maximilian Schell, and Albert Lieven. It was shot at the Göttingen Studios in Göttingen. The film's sets were designed by the art director Alfred Bütow.

Cast
 Adelheid Seeck as Charlotte Holsten
 Christine Keller  as Regine Albing
 Maximilian Schell as Jürgen Sengebusch
 Mathias Wieman as Obersdtudiendirektor Dr. Berger
 Albert Lieven as Studienrat Dr. Crusius
 Klaus Barner as Erich Mettke, Oberprimaner
 Charles Brauer as Bert Ilgen, Oberprimaner
 Harald Giese as Andreas Bolz, Oberprimaner
 Brigitte Grothum as Dora
 Wolfgang Höper as Klaus Helmer, Oberprimaner
 Ilse Künkele as Sekretärin des Direktors
 Phoebe Monnard as Frau Scholz, Dr. Crusius' Wirtin
 Eberhard Müller-Elmau as Neckermann, Hausmeister
 Kurt Vespermann as Oberstudienrat Dr. Türck
 Ernst von Klipstein as Studienrat Baumbauer

References

Bibliography 
 Bock, Hans-Michael & Bergfelder, Tim. The Concise CineGraph. Encyclopedia of German Cinema. Berghahn Books, 2009.

External links 
 

1955 films
West German films
German drama films
1955 drama films
1950s German-language films
Films directed by Ulrich Erfurth
Remakes of German films
German films based on plays
1950s high school films
German black-and-white films
1950s German films
Films shot at Göttingen Studios